Throne and Liberty (also known as TL) is an upcoming massively multiplayer online role-playing game (MMORPG) developed by NCSoft. It will be published by NCSoft in South Korea and internationally by Amazon Games. It was supposed to be part of the Lineage series and a sequel to the first Lineage game, but it was repurposed and restructured well into development. The game was first announced and titled as Lineage Eternal in November 2011 but has suffered numerous delays in its release schedule, with the earliest beta testing planned. The first South Korea Closed Beta began in 2016, starting on November 30 and ending on December 4. NCSoft has rebooted the game as Project TL in NCSOFT Director Cut private event.

Development
The game has suffered from numerous delays during development. NCSOFT officially announced Lineage Eternal as the sequel to the first Lineage, released in 1998 on November 8, 2011. The first gameplay videos debuted at the G-Star 2011 gaming convention in South Korea on November 9. In August 2013, NCSOFT was preparing to roll out the beta schedule of Lineage Eternal by the end of that year. The developers planned to initiate beta testing in Korea towards the end of year of 2015, but during a conference call in November they confirmed that closed beta testing would be delayed until '16.

In NCSOFT Q1 2017 earning conferences, NCSOFT had said that the development team of Lineage Eternal had significant changes due to the change of game producer. The new team continued the development process of the game with a new target and changes to the game engine from a proprietary game engine that was used in Guild Wars to Unreal Engine 4. The game has changed to Project TL in 2017.

References
https://tl.plaync.com Official Homepage

External links
Lineage Eternal CBT1 (500 screenshots)

PlayStation 5 games
Lineage (series)
Massively multiplayer online role-playing games
NCSoft games
Upcoming video games
Video game sequels
Video games developed in South Korea
Windows games
Unreal Engine games